The University of Minnesota, formally the University of Minnesota, Twin Cities, (UMN Twin Cities, the U of M, or Minnesota) is a public land-grant research university in the Twin Cities of Minneapolis and Saint Paul, Minnesota, United States. The Twin Cities campus is the oldest and largest in the University of Minnesota system and has the ninth-largest main campus student body in the United States, with 52,376 students at the start of the 2021–22 academic year. It is the flagship institution of the University of Minnesota System, and is organized into 19 colleges, schools, and other major academic units.

The Minnesota Territorial Legislature drafted a charter for the U of M as a territorial university in 1851, seven years before Minnesota became a state. Today, the university is classified among "R1: Doctoral Universities – Very high research activity". Minnesota is a member of the Association of American Universities and is ranked 20th in research activity, with $1.04 billion in research and development expenditures in the fiscal year 2020. In 2001, the University of Minnesota was included in a list of Public Ivy universities, which includes publicly funded universities thought to provide a quality of education comparable to that of the Ivy League.

University of Minnesota faculty, alumni, and researchers have won 26 Nobel Prizes and 3 Pulitzer Prizes. Among its alumni, the university counts 25 Rhodes Scholars, 7 Marshall Scholars, 21 Truman Scholars, and 134 Fulbright recipients. The university also has Guggenheim Fellowship, Carnegie Fellowship, and MacArthur Fellowship holders, as well as past and present graduates and faculty belonging to the American Academy of Arts and Sciences, National Academy of Sciences, National Academy of Medicine, and National Academy of Engineering. Notable University of Minnesota alumni include two vice presidents of the United States, Hubert Humphrey and Walter Mondale, and Bob Dylan, who received the 2016 Nobel Prize in Literature.

The Minnesota Golden Gophers compete in 21 intercollegiate sports in the NCAA Division I Big Ten Conference and have won 29 national championships. As of 2021, Minnesota's current and former students have won a total of 76 Olympic medals.

History

The University of Minnesota was founded in Minneapolis in 1851 as a college preparatory school, seven years prior to Minnesota's statehood. It struggled in its early years and relied on donations to stay open from donors including South Carolina Governor William Aiken Jr.

In 1867, the university received land grant status through the Morrill Act of 1862.

An 1876 donation from flour miller John S. Pillsbury is generally credited with saving the school. Since then, Pillsbury has become known as "The Father of the University". Pillsbury Hall is named in his honor.

Academics

Organization and administration
The university is organized into 19 colleges, schools, and other major academic units:

Institutes and centers
Six university-wide interdisciplinary centers and institutes work across collegiate lines:
 Center for Cognitive Sciences
 Consortium on Law and Values in Health, Environment, and the Life Sciences
 Institute for Advanced Study, University of Minnesota
 Institute for Engineering in Medicine
 Institute for Translational Neuroscience
 Institute on the Environment
 Minnesota Population Center

Rankings

Global
In 2021, the University of Minnesota was ranked as the 40th best university in the world by the Academic Ranking of World Universities (ARWU), which assesses academic and research performance. The same 2021 ranking by subject placed the University of Minnesota's ecology program as 2nd best in the world, management program as 10th best, biotechnology program as 11th best, mechanical engineering and medical technology programs as 14th best, law and psychology programs as 19th best, and veterinary sciences program as 20th best. The Center for World University Rankings (CWUR) for 2021-22 ranked Minnesota 46th in the world and 26th in the United States. The 2021 Nature Index, which assesses the institutions that dominate high-quality research output, ranked Minnesota 53rd in the world based on research publication data from 2020. U.S. News & World Report ranked Minnesota as the 47th best global university for 2021. The 2022 Times Higher Education World University Rankings placed Minnesota 86th worldwide, based primarily on teaching, research, knowledge transfer, and international outlook.

National
In 2021, Minnesota was ranked as the 24th best university in the United States by the Academic Ranking of World Universities, and 20th in the United States in Washington Monthlys 2021 National University Rankings. Minnesota's undergraduate program was ranked 68th among national universities by U.S. News & World Report for 2022, and 26th in the nation among public colleges and universities. The same publication ranked Minnesota's graduate Carlson School of Management as 28th in the nation among business schools, and 6th in the nation for its information systems graduate program. Other graduate schools ranked highly by U.S. News & World Report for 2022 include the University of Minnesota Law School at 22nd, the University of Minnesota Medical School, which was 4th for family medicine and 5th for primary care, the University of Minnesota College of Pharmacy, which ranked 3rd, the Hubert H. Humphrey School of Public Affairs, which ranked 9th, the University of Minnesota College of Education and Human Development, which ranked 10th for education psychology and special education, and the University of Minnesota School of Public Health, which ranked 10th.

In 2020, the Center for Measuring University Performance ranked Minnesota 16th in the nation in terms of total research, 30th in endowment assets, 24th in annual giving, 28th in the number of National Academies of Sciences, Engineering and Medicine memberships, 9th in its number of faculty awards, and 14th in its number of National Merit Scholars. 
Minnesota is listed as a "Public Ivy" in 2001 Greenes' Guides The Public Ivies: America's Flagship Public Universities.

 Undergraduate admissions 

The 2022 annual ranking of U.S. News & World Report categorizes undergraduate admissions to Minnesota as "more selective". For the Class of 2025 (enrolled fall 2021), Minnesota received 35,905 applications and accepted 26,295 (73.2%). Of those accepted, 6,883 enrolled, a yield rate (the percentage of accepted students who choose to attend the university) of 26.2%. Minnesota's freshman retention rate is 92%, with 84% going on to graduate within six years.

The university started test-optional admissions with the Fall 2021 incoming class and has extended this through Fall 2025. Of the 41% of enrolled freshmen in 2021 who submitted ACT scores; the middle 50 percent Composite score was between 27 and 32. Of the 7% of the incoming freshman class who submitted SAT scores; the middle 50 percent Composite scores were 1320–1470. 

The University of Minnesota is a college sponsor of the National Merit Scholarship Program and sponsored 97 Merit Scholarship awards in 2020. In the 2020–2021 academic year, 112 freshman students were National Merit Scholars.

Discoveries and innovation
Inventions by University of Minnesota students and faculty have ranged from food science to health technologies. Most of the public research funding in Minnesota is funneled to the University of Minnesota as a result of long-standing advocacy by the university itself.

The university developed Gopher, a precursor to the World Wide Web which used hyperlinks to connect documents across computers on the internet. However, the version produced by CERN was favored by the public since it was freely distributed and could more easily handle multimedia webpages. The university also houses the Charles Babbage Institute, a research and archive center specializing in computer history. The department has strong roots in the early days of supercomputing with Seymour Cray of Cray supercomputers.

The university also became a member of the Laser Interferometer Gravitational-wave Observatory (LIGO) in 2007 and has led data analysis projects searching for gravitational waves – the existence of which was confirmed by scientists in February 2016.

Discoveries and innovation by faculty or (former) students include:
Puffed rice – Alexander P. Anderson performed work leading to the discovery of "puffed rice", a starting point for a new breakfast cereal later advertised as "Food Shot From Guns".
Transistorized cardiac pacemaker – Earl Bakken founded Medtronic, where he developed the first external, battery-operated, transistorized, wearable artificial pacemaker in 1957.
Green Revolution – Norman Borlaug was an American agronomist who led initiatives worldwide that contributed to extensive increases in agricultural production termed the Green Revolution. Borlaug, often called "the father of the Green Revolution", is credited with saving over a billion people worldwide from starvation. Borlaug was awarded multiple honors for his work, including the Nobel Peace Prize, the Presidential Medal of Freedom, and the Congressional Gold Medal.
ATP synthase – Paul D. Boyer elucidated the enzymatic mechanism for synthesis of the cellular "energy currency", adenosine triphosphate (ATP), leading to a Nobel Prize in Chemistry, 1997.
Point-contact transistor – Walter Houser Brattain and John Bardeen, later joined by William Shockley, invented the point-contact transistor in December 1947. For their invention, the trio was awarded a Nobel Prize in Physics in 1956.
Infusion pump – Henry Buchwald invented the world's first infusion port, peritoneovenous shunts, and specialty vascular catheters. He also invented the first implantable infusion pump, a precursor to implantable infusion pumps in use throughout the world today.
Photosynthesis – Melvin Calvin discovered the Calvin cycle along with Andrew Benson and James Bassham; for this, he won the 1961 Nobel Prize in Chemistry.
Ecology – Raymond Lindeman revolutionized ecology, primarily through his 1942 paper "Trophic Dynamic Aspect of Ecology", which described how energy and nutrients cycled through ecosystems.
Supercomputer – Seymour Cray designed a series of computers that were the fastest in the world for decades, and founded Cray Research, which built many of these machines.
Taconite – Edward Wilson Davis developed an engineering process to economically extract iron ore from hard taconite rocks, making taconite valuable as iron ore for the iron and steel industries. 
Cosmic rays – Phyllis S. Freier discovered the presence of heavy nuclei in cosmic rays, proving the similarity between the Solar System and the rest of the galaxy.
U.S. aviation – Robert Rowe Gilruth led the development of flying qualities for airplanes, the use of rockets to achieve data at supersonic speeds, and the establishment of many of the nation's leading flight research and human space flight operations facilities.
Bone marrow transplant – Robert A. Good in 1968 performed the first successful human bone marrow transplant between persons who were not identical twins and is regarded as a founder of modern immunology. In 2018 Minnesota Gov. Mark Dayton proclaimed August 24 as University of Minnesota Blood and Marrow Transplant Day.
Gore-Tex – Robert Gore invented Gore-Tex materials in 1969. 
Disk drive – Reynold B. Johnson invented a method and machinery to score tests electronically.
K-rations – Ancel Keys developed the rations for the U.S. military and also conducted dietary studies: the Minnesota Starvation Study and the Seven Countries Study.
Synthetic rubber – Izaak Kolthoff developed the "cold process" for producing synthetic rubber, which he undertook under the U.S. synthetic rubber program during World War II. 
Cyclotron – Ernest Lawrence won the Nobel Prize for Physics 1939 for inventing and developing the cyclotron.
Drosophila melanogaster – Edward Lewis won the Nobel Prize in Physiology or Medicine in 1995 for his work on the Drosophila bithorax complex of homeotic genes.
Cardiac surgery – C. Walton Lillehei pioneered open-heart surgery, as well as numerous techniques, equipment, and prostheses for cardiothoracic surgery.
POPmail – Mark P. McCahill led the development of the Gopher protocol, the effective predecessor of the World Wide Web; was involved in creating and codifying the standard for Uniform Resource Locators (URLs); and led the development of POPmail, one of the first e-mail clients, which had a foundational influence on later e-mail clients and the popularization of graphical user interfaces in Internet technologies more broadly.
MMPI – Starke R. Hathaway and J. C. McKinley created the Minnesota Multiphasic Personality Inventory (MMPI), which was first published in 1943.
Zatocoding – Calvin Mooers developed a mechanical system using superimposed codes of descriptors for information retrieval called Zatocoding, 1948. 
Atomic bomb – Edward P. Ney discovered cosmic ray heavy nuclei and solar proton events. After early work involving separating isotopes from uranium, he worked on the Manhattan Project. 
Atomic bomb – Alfred O. C. Nier devised a method to isolate the isotopes of uranium, a critical discovery in the atomic age. Nier worked with Kellex Corporation in New York City on the design and development of efficient and effective mass spectrographs for use in the Manhattan Project to build the atomic bomb in World War II. He designed most of the spectrographs used for monitoring uranium separations during the war.
Atomic bomb – Frank Oppenheimer worked on uranium isotope separation in 1945 and joined the Manhattan Project.
Biotechnology – Ronald L. Phillips was the first to generate whole corn plants from cells grown in culture, which laid the foundation for, and sparked, a new industry using cell-culture methods to genetically modify corn plants and other cereals. The corn cell line most widely used for genetic modification of corn has greatly accelerated the improvement of corn as food, feed, and fuel.
Renewable energy – Lanny D. Schmidt designed a reactor to extract hydrogen from ethanol, offering the first real hope hydrogen could be a source of inexpensive and renewable energy.
Biomimetics – Otto Schmitt invented the Schmitt trigger, the cathode follower, the differential amplifier, and the chopper-stabilized amplifier.
NASA – Deke Slayton was one of the original NASA Mercury Seven astronauts and became NASA's first chief of the Astronaut Office.  He served as NASA's director of flight crew operations, making him responsible for crew assignments at NASA, from November 1963 until March 1972. At that time, he was granted medical clearance to fly and was assigned as the docking module pilot of the 1975 Apollo–Soyuz Test Project, at age 51 becoming the oldest person to fly in space at the time. 
Bathythermograph – Athelstan Spilhaus fully developed the bathythermograph (BT) in 1938, an instrument he perfected that was of vital importance in World War II against the German U-boat. During the war, the BT became standard equipment on all U.S. Navy subs and vessels involved in antisubmarine warfare.
CDC 6600 – James Thornton developed the CDC 6600, the world's first supercomputer, designed with Seymour Cray.
Ziagen – Robert Vince worked on antiviral drug candidates at UMN, where he went on to develop carbocyclic nucleosides termed 'carbovirs.' This class of medicinal agents included the drug abacavir. Abacavir was commercialized by GlaxoSmithKline as Ziagen for the treatment of AIDS.
US3D - Graham Candler pioneered the future of hypersonics research with the development of the US3D CFD code which builds off of NASA's DPLR code, but uses unstructured grids and has many advanced numerical capabilities and physical models for multi-physics, highly coupled problems.

Campuses
Demographics: Twin Cities (Minneapolis and St. Paul) campus
Note: The flagship University of Minnesota campus is the Twin Cities campus, which comprises grounds in St. Paul and Minneapolis, the latter divided into areas on both the east and west banks of the Mississippi River. Administratively, these are all one campus, but for purposes of simplicity, this article will apply "campus" to its component parts where necessary to avoid confusion with the names of cities.

As the largest of five campuses across the University of Minnesota system, the Twin Cities campus has more than 50,000 students; this makes it the ninth-largest campus student body in the United States overall. It also has more than 300 research, education, and outreach centers and institutes, on everything from the life sciences to public policy and technology.

The university (system-wide) offers 154 undergraduate degree programs, 24 undergraduate certificates, 307 graduate degree programs, and 79 graduate certificates. The university offers the majority of these programs and certificates at its Twin Cities campus. The university has all three branches of the Reserve Officer Training Corps (ROTC). The Twin Cities campus, as well as the campuses at Crookston, Duluth, Morris, and Rochester, are accredited by the Higher Learning Commission (HLC).

The racial/ethnic breakdown of the student population is: 65.3% White, 12.7% International Students (that are undesignated race/ethnicity), 9.2% Asian, 4.3% Black, 3.1% Hispanic/Latino, 1.2% American/Native American Indian, and 4.2% Unknown. Among matriculants to the university, 63% are considered Minnesota residents and 37% are considered out-of-state residents. According to the University Office of Institutional Research, as of fall 2019 there were 31,367 undergraduates at the University of Minnesota Twin Cities campus. Of that number, 6,278 were first-time, degree-seeking freshmen. There were 12,100 graduate students.

Minneapolis campus
The original Minneapolis campus overlooked the Saint Anthony Falls on the Mississippi River, but it was later moved about a mile (1.6 km) downstream to its current location. The school shut down following a financial crisis during the American Civil War, but reopened in 1867 with considerable financial help from John S. Pillsbury. It was upgraded from a preparatory school to a college in 1869. Today, the university's Minneapolis campus is divided by the Mississippi River into an East and West Bank. The West Bank is home to the University of Minnesota Law School, the Humphrey School of Public Affairs, the Carlson School of Management, various social science buildings, and the performing arts center.

The Minneapolis campus has several residence halls: 17th Avenue Hall, Centennial Hall, Frontier Hall, Territorial Hall, Pioneer Hall, Sanford Hall, Wilkins Hall, Middlebrook Hall, Yudof Hall, and Comstock Hall.

East Bank

To help ease navigation of the large campus, the university has divided the East Bank into several areas: the Knoll area, the Mall area, the Health area, the Athletic area, and the Gateway area.The Knoll area, the oldest extant part of the university, is in the northwestern corner of the campus. Many buildings in this area are well over 100 years old, such as some of the 13 in the Old Campus Historic District. Today, most disciplines in this area relate to the humanities. Burton Hall is home to the College of Education and Human Development. Folwell Hall and Jones Hall are primarily used by the language departments. A residence hall, Sanford Hall, and a student-apartment complex, Roy Wilkins Hall, are in this area. This area is just south of the Dinkytown neighborhood and business area.Northrop Mall, or the Mall area, is arguably the center of the Minneapolis campus. The plan for the Mall was based on a design by Cass Gilbert, although his scheme was too extravagant to be fully implemented. Several of the campus's primary buildings surround the Mall area. Northrop Auditorium provides a northern anchor, with Coffman Memorial Union (CMU) to the south. Four of the larger buildings to the sides of the Mall are the primary mathematics, physics, and chemistry buildings (Vincent Hall, Tate Laboratory and Smith Hall, respectively) and Walter Library. The Mall area is home to the College of Liberal Arts, which is Minnesota's largest public or private college, and the College of Science and Engineering. Behind CMU is another residence hall, Comstock Hall, and another student-apartment complex, Yudof Hall. The Northrop Mall Historic District was formally listed in the National Register of Historic Places in January 2018.The Health area is to the southeast of the Mall area and focuses on undergraduate buildings for biological science students, as well as the homes of the College of Pharmacy, the School of Nursing, the School of Dentistry, the Medical School, the School of Public Health, and M Health Fairview Hospitals and Clinics. This complex of buildings forms what is known as the University of Minnesota Medical Center. Part of the College of Biological Sciences is housed in this area.

Across the street from the University of Minnesota Medical Center Fairview is an area known as the "Superblock", a four-city-block space comprising four residence halls (Pioneer, Frontier, Centennial and Territorial Halls). The Superblock is one of the most popular locations for on-campus housing because it has the largest concentration of students living on campus and has a multitude of social activities between the residence halls.The Athletic area is directly north of the Superblock and includes four recreation/athletic facilities: the University Recreation Center, Cooke Hall, the University Fieldhouse, and the University Aquatic Center. These facilities are all connected by tunnels and skyways, allowing students to use one locker room facility. North of this complex is the Huntington Bank Stadium, Williams Arena, Mariucci Arena, Ridder Arena, and the Baseline Tennis Center.The Gateway area, the easternmost section of campus, is primarily composed of office buildings instead of classrooms and lecture halls. The most prominent building is McNamara Alumni Center. The university is also heavily invested in a biomedical research initiative and has built five biomedical research buildings that form a biomedical complex directly north of Huntington Bank Stadium.

Notable architecture

The Armory, northeast of the Mall area, is built like a Norman castle. It features a sally-port entrance facing Church Street and a tower that was originally intended to be the professor of military science's residence. Since it originally held the athletics department, the Armory also features a gymnasium. Today it is home to military science classes and the university's Reserve Officers' Training Corps.

Several buildings in the Old Campus Historic District were designed by early Minnesota architect LeRoy Buffington. One of the most notable is Pillsbury Hall, designed by Buffington and Harvey Ellis in the Richardsonian Romanesque style. Pillsbury Hall's polychromatic facade incorporates several sandstone varieties that were available in Minnesota during the time of construction. Buffington also designed the exterior of Burton Hall, considered one of the strongest specimens of Greek Revival architecture in Minnesota.

Many of the buildings on the East Bank were designed by the prolific Minnesota architect Clarence H. Johnston, including the Jacobean Folwell Hall and the Beaux-Arts edifices of Northrop Auditorium and Walter Library, which he considered the heart of the university. Johnston's son, Clarence Johnston Jr, was also an architect and designed the original Bell Museum building and Coffman Memorial Union in the 1930s.

The Malcolm Moos Health Sciences Tower, which is the tallest building on the Twin Cities campus, is a noted example of brutalist architecture.

In more recent years, Frank Gehry designed the Frederick R. Weisman Art Museum. Completed in 1993, the Weisman Art Museum is a typical example of his work with curving metallic structures. The abstract structure is considered highly significant because it was built prior to the widespread use of computer-aided design in architecture. It also ushered in a new era of architecture at the university, which continued with the completion of the McNamara Alumni Center in 2000 and Bruininks Hall (formerly STSS) in 2010.

Another notable structure is the addition to the Architecture building, designed by Steven Holl and completed in 2002. It won an American Institute of Architects award for its innovative design. The Architecture building was then renamed Rapson Hall after the local modernist architect and School of Architecture Dean Ralph Rapson.

The university also has a "Greek row" of historic fraternities and sororities located north of campus on University Avenue SE. 

West Bank

The West Bank Arts Quarter includes:

Rarig Center (Theatre Arts & Dance)
The Barbara Barker Center for Dance
Ferguson Hall (School of Music)
Ted Mann Concert Hall
Regis Center for Art

The Quarter is home to several annual interdisciplinary arts festivals.

The Social Sciences are also on the West Bank and include the Carlson School of Management, the Law School, and the Hubert H. Humphrey School of Public Affairs.

Wilson Library, the largest library in the university system, is also on the West Bank, as is Middlebrook Hall, the largest residence hall on campus. Approximately 900 students reside in the building named in honor of William T. Middlebrook.

Getting around

The Washington Avenue Bridge crossing the Mississippi River provides access between the East and West Banks, on foot and via designated bike lanes and a free shuttle service. The bridge has two separate decks: the lower deck for vehicles and the newly constructed light rail, and the upper deck for pedestrian and bicycle traffic. An unheated enclosed walkway runs the length of the bridge and shelters pedestrians from the weather. Walking and riding bicycles are the most common modes of transportation among students. University Police occasionally cite individuals for jaywalking or riding bicycles on restricted sidewalks in areas surrounding the university, resulting in fines as high as $250. This is often done at the beginning of a school year or after pedestrians interfere with traffic.

Several pedestrian tunnels ease the passage from building to building during harsh weather; they are marked with signs reading "The Gopher Way".

The Minneapolis campus is near Interstates 94 and 35W and is bordered by the Minneapolis neighborhoods of Dinkytown (on the north), Cedar-Riverside (on the west), Stadium Village (on the southeast), and Prospect Park (on the east).

Three light-rail stations serve the university along the Green Line: Stadium Village, East Bank, and West Bank. The university partnered with Metro to offer students, staff, and faculty members a Campus Zone Pass that enables free travel on the three stations that pass through campus, as well as a discounted unlimited pass for students.

St. Paul campus

The default place name for the ZIP code serving the campus is "St. Paul", but "Falcon Heights" is also recognized for use in the street addresses of all campus buildings. The College of Food, Agricultural and Natural Resource Sciences, including the University of Minnesota Food Industry Center and many other disciplines from social sciences to vocational education, are on this campus. It also includes the College of Continuing and Professional Studies, College of Veterinary Medicine, and College of Biological Sciences. The extensive lawns, flowers, trees, and surrounding University research farm plots create a greener and quieter campus. It has a grassy mall of its own and can be a bit of a retreat from the more urban Minneapolis campus. Prominent on this campus is Bailey Hall, the St. Paul campus' only residence hall. Campus Connector buses run every five minutes on weekdays when school is in session, and every 20 minutes on weekends, allowing students easy access to both campuses.

The Continuing Education and Conference Center, which serves over 20,000 conference attendees per year, is also on the St. Paul campus.

The St. Paul campus is home to the College of Design's Department of Design, Housing, and Apparel (DHA). Located in McNeal Hall, DHA includes the departmental disciplines of apparel design, graphic design, housing studies, interior design, and retail merchandising.

The St. Paul campus is known to University students and staff for the Meat and Dairy Salesroom, which sells animal food products (such as ice cream, cheese, and meat) produced in the university's state-certified pilot plant by students, faculty and staff.

The St. Paul campus borders the Minnesota State Fairgrounds, which hosts the largest state fair in the United States by daily attendance. The fair lasts 12 days, from late August through Labor Day. The grounds also serve a variety of functions during the rest of the year.

Although the Falcon Heights area code is 651, the university telephone system trunk lines use Minneapolis exchanges and its 612 area code.

Commuting between Minneapolis and St. Paul campuses
On regular weekdays during the school year, the Campus Connectors operate with schedule-less service as often as every five minutes during the busiest parts of the school day (between 7 am and 5:30 pm), slowing to once every 15 or 20 minutes during earlier or later hours. The estimated commute time between St. Paul and the East Bank is 15 minutes. In 2008, the system carried 3.55 million riders. Although the shuttle service is free, it is comparatively inexpensive to operate; with an operating cost of $4.55 million in 2008, the operating subsidy was only $1.28 per passenger. Even Metro Transit's busy Metro Blue Line light rail required a subsidy of $1.44 that year, and that was with many riders paying $1.75 or more for a ride.

Campus safety
The Step Up campaign is a program that helps students prevent excessive drinking, as well as sexual assault and other crimes, by teaching them how to intervene and prevent in a positive way. This is done, in part, by explaining the bystander effect. The U of M also has a TXT-U emergency notification text messaging system that sends out a notification to all faculty, staff, and students in case of emergency. Other resources help students get home safely. Calling 624-WALK secures an escort for walks to adjacent campuses and neighborhoods, and Gopher Chauffeur, a van service, offers rides near and on campus. Both are free and open to all students, staff, and faculty.

In addition, the campus has nearly 200 automated external defibrillators (AEDs) and 200 yellow phones for emergency-only calls. The University Police Station has 20 Code Blue phones around campus that immediately connect people to their office. There are also over 2,000 security cameras being monitored 24 hours a day.

Sexual assaults

Minnesota Gophers football player Dominic Jones was convicted of sexual assault in 2008. In July 2009, an appeals court upheld Jones' conviction, but reduced his four-year prison sentence to one year. More than 1,000 sexual assaults on campus were reported between 2010 and 2015. No prosecutions for rape occurred, according to Katie Eichele of the Aurora Center, until the conviction of Daniel Drill-Mellum in 2016, for the rapes of two fellow students. Drill-Mellum received a six-year prison sentence.

It has been alleged that few sexual assaults on campus are reported to University police.  Six resulted in arrest from 2010 to 2015; one was determined to be unfounded. In a study by campus police, in the years between 2005 and 2015, sexual assaults at the university remained the same or increased despite six sexual assault resources and many anti-crime programs on campus. In August 2020, the University of Minnesota agreed to pay $500,000 to a woman who in the fall of 2016, accused several Gophers football players of sexually assaulting her. In February 2017, a University of Minnesota panel cleared four of the 10 Gopher football players the woman accused and agreed with investigators' recommendation that four other players be expelled and the other two players should be suspended for a year.

Student life and traditions

Greek life, professional and honor societies

The University of Minnesota has numerous fraternities and sororities. Including defunct branches, the Greek System numbers more than 200 organizations, approximately half of which operate today. The university's Greek societies include the residential Academic and Social chapters, including non-residential multicultural groups. The Greek System includes some but not all Professional Fraternities, Honor Societies, Religious and Service Fraternities. Fraternities and sororities have built several historically significant "Fraternity Row" homes along University Ave. SE, 10th Ave. SE, 4th Street SE, and 5th Street SE, all in Minneapolis, or along Cleveland Ave. near the St. Paul campus.

As of June 2018, approximately 3,900 system members made up about 11% of the campus population. Minnesota hosts 38 academic fraternities, 20 academic sororities, 56 honors societies, 31 professional societies, and two service-focused chapters.University of Minnesota, List of student organizations .

Media

PrintThe Minnesota Daily has been published twice a week during the normal school season since the fall semester 2016. It is printed weekly during the summer. The Daily is operated by an autonomous organization run entirely by students. It was first published on May 1, 1900. Besides everyday news coverage, the paper has also published special issues, such as the Grapevine Awards, Ski-U-Mah, the Bar & Beer Guide, Sex-U-Mah, and others.

A long-defunct humor magazine, Ski-U-Mah, was published from about 1930 to 1950. It launched the career of novelist and scriptwriter Max Shulman.

A relative newcomer to the university's print media community is The Wake Student Magazine, a weekly that covers UMN-related stories and provides a forum for student expression. It was founded in November 2001 in an effort to diversify campus media and achieved student group status in February 2002. Students from many disciplines do all of the reporting, writing, editing, illustration, photography, layout, and business management for the publication. The magazine was founded by James DeLong and Chris Ruen. The Wake was named the nation's best campus publication (2006) by the Independent Press Association.

Additionally, the Wake publishes Liminal, a literary journal begun in 2005. Liminal was created in the absence of an undergraduate literary journal and continues to bring poetry and prose to the university community.The Wake has faced a number of challenges during its existence, due in part to the reliance on student fees funding. In April 2004, after the Student Services Fees Committee had initially declined to fund it, the needed $60,000 in funding was restored, allowing the magazine to continue publishing. It faced further challenges in 2005, when its request for additional funding to publish weekly was denied and then partially restored.

In 2005 conservatives on campus began formulating a new publication named The Minnesota Republic. The first issue was released in February 2006, and funding by student service fees started in September 2006. The Republic is a biweekly newspaper run entirely by students, reporting on campus, state, and national news with commentary on sports, economics, and arts and entertainment. The Republic is a member of the Collegiate Network, a program that includes over 100 publications at colleges and universities around the United States.

Radio

The campus radio station, KUOM "Radio K", broadcasts an eclectic variety of independent music during the day on 770 kHz AM. In 2003, the station added a low-power (8-watt) signal on 106.5 MHz FM overnight and on weekends. In 2005, a 10-watt translator began broadcasting from Falcon Heights on 100.7 FM at all times. Radio K also streams its content at www.radiok.org. With roots in experimental transmissions that began before World War I, the station received the first AM broadcast license in the state on January 13, 1922, and began broadcasting as WLB, changing to the KUOM call sign about two decades later. The station had an educational format until 1993, when it merged with a smaller campus-only music station to become what is now known as Radio K. A small group of full-time employees are joined by over 20 part-time student employees who oversee the station. Most of the on-air talent consists of student volunteers.

Television
Some television programs made on campus have been broadcast on local PBS station KTCI channel 17. Several episodes of Great Conversations have been made since 2002, featuring one-on-one discussions between University faculty and experts brought in from around the world. Tech Talk'' was a show meant to help people who feel intimidated by modern technology, including cellular phones and computers.

Minnesota Student Association
The Minnesota Student Association (MSA) is the undergraduate student government at the University of Minnesota. It advocates for student interests on local, state, and federal levels, and focuses on efforts that directly benefit the student population.

"Gopher Chauffeur", originally titled the MSA Express, is a student-operated late-night ride service. Piloted by MSA, the 2007–2008 administration of Emma Olson and Ross Skattum began the process of transitioning the service to the university's Boynton Health Services. This was done to ensure its longevity. Student response was overwhelmingly positive, and the program was expanded in recent years due to campus safety concerns.

MSA was instrumental in passing legislation in the 2013 Minnesota Legislature for medical amnesty, and has focused more heavily on legislative advocacy in recent years.

Graduate and Professional Student Assembly
The Graduate and Professional Student Assembly (GAPSA) was responsible for graduate and professional student governance at the University of Minnesota. It is the largest and most comprehensive graduate/professional student governance organization in the United States. GAPSA serves students in the Carlson School of Management, the Dental School, the Graduate School, the Law School, the Medical School, the School of Nursing, the College of Pharmacy, the School of Public Health, the College of Veterinary Medicine, and the College of Education and Human Development. GAPSA is also a member of the National Association of Graduate-Professional Students.

The University of Minnesota has the second-largest number of graduate and professional students in the United States at over 16,000. All registered graduate and professional students at UMN are members of GAPSA. It was established in 1990 as a nonprofit (IRS 501 (c)(3)) confederation of independent college councils representing all graduate and professional students at the University of Minnesota to the Board of Regents, the president of the university, the University Senate, UMN at large and the wider community. GAPSA served as a resource for member councils, as the primary contact point for administrative units, as a graduate and professional student policy-making and policy-influencing body, and as a center of intercollegiate and intracollegiate interaction among students.

In 2014, GAPSA split into two organizations and ceased to exist as such due to an increasing separation between the needs of graduate and professional students. COGS (the Council of Graduate Students) broke off from the larger body, which then renamed to PSG (Professional Student Governance). Both units continue to fulfill the former functions of GAPSA for the respective student bodies each represents.

Student activism
Student activism has played an important role at the university, including campaigns to desegregate campus housing in the 1930s and 1940s, Black students' take over of Morrill Hall in 1969, which led to the creation of the Department of Afro-American Studies, now known as the Department of African-American and African Studies, the 1970 student strike against war, campaigns to keep the General College open in the 2000s, campaigns against racism in 2014–2015 known as Whose Diversity?, and many graduate student unionization efforts. For example, recent labor coalition efforts in the 2021–2022 academic year have highlighted poor wage, poor stipend conditions, and administrative disrespect for graduate student workers.. In the 2022-2023 academic year, such labor efforts have materialized into a renewed, official unionization campaign.

Athletics
Minnesota's Twin Cities campus athletics teams are called the Minnesota Golden Gophers and are members of the Big Ten Conference and the Western Collegiate Hockey Association (WCHA) in the National Collegiate Athletic Association (NCAA). As of 2019, they have won 19 NCAA championships and claim nine national football championships.

Since the 2013–14 school year, the only Minnesota team that does not compete in the Big Ten is the women's ice hockey team, which competes in the WCHA. The Gophers men's ice hockey team was a longtime WCHA member, but left when the Big Ten began operating a men's ice hockey league with six inaugural members. The current athletic director is Mark Coyle.

The Golden Gophers' most notable rivalry is the annual college football game against the Wisconsin Badgers (University of Wisconsin–Madison, Madison, Wisconsin) for Paul Bunyan's Axe. The two universities also compete in the Border Battle, a year-long athletic competition in which each sport season is worth 40 points divided by the number of times the teams play each other (i.e. football is worth 40 points because they play each other only once, while women's ice hockey is worth 10 points per game because they play four times a year). Conference and postseason playoffs do not count in the point standings.

Goldy Gopher is the mascot for the Twin Cities campus and the associated sports teams. The gopher mascot is a tradition as old as the state, which was tabbed the "Gopher State" in 1857 after a political cartoon ridiculing the $5 million railroad loan that helped open up the West. The cartoon portrayed shifty railroad barons as striped gophers pulling a railroad car carrying the Territorial Legislature. Later, the university picked up the nickname with the first university yearbook, bearing the name "Gopher Annual", appearing in 1887.

The Minnesota Rouser is university's fight song. It is commonly played and sung by the 320-member Minnesota Marching Band at events such as commencement, convocation, and athletic games. Other songs associated with the university include the Minnesota March, which was composed for the university by John Philip Sousa, and Hail! Minnesota, the university's alma mater and state song of Minnesota.

Football

The Minnesota Golden Gophers are one of the oldest programs in college football history. They have won seven national championships and 18 Big Ten Conference Championships. The Golden Gophers played their first game on September 29, 1882, a 4–0 victory over Hamline University, St. Paul. In 1887, the Golden Gophers played host to the Wisconsin Badgers in a 63–0 victory. With the exception of 1906, the Golden Gophers and the Badgers have played each other every year since. The 128 games played against each other make this the most played rivalry in NCAA Division I FBS college football.

In 1981, the Golden Gophers played their last game in Memorial Stadium. Between 1982 and 2008, the school played their home games in the Hubert H. Humphrey Metrodome in downtown Minneapolis. They moved back to campus on September 12, 2009, when their new home, TCF Bank Stadium, opened with a game against the Air Force Falcons of the U.S. Air Force Academy. Often referred to as The Bank, the stadium was renamed Huntington Bank Stadium in June 2021 to reflect the acquisition of TCF Bank by Huntington Bank.

Basketball

The Golden Gophers men's basketball team has won two National Championships, two National Invitation Tournament (NIT) Championships, and eight Big Ten Regular Season Championships. They also have six NCAA Tournament appearances, including a Final Four appearance in 1997 and three Sweet 16 appearances. However, because of NCAA sanctions for academic fraud, all postseason appearances from 1994 to 1998—in the NCAA Tournament in 1994, 1995, and 1997 and NIT in 1996 and 1998—were vacated. Most recently, in April 2014 the Golden Gophers defeated SMU to win the NIT championship at Madison Square Garden in New York City.

The Golden Gophers women's basketball team has enjoyed success in recent years under Pam Borton, including a Final Four appearance in 2004. Overall, they have six NCAA Tournament appearances and three Sweet 16 appearances.

Men's hockey

The Golden Gophers men's hockey program has won 5 Division I National Championships, and 24 conference championships (including 13 WCHA and 4 Big Ten Hockey season championships. They have won 14 WCHA Tournament Championships and have 20 NCAA Frozen Four appearances. A former Golden Gophers hockey tradition was to fill a majority of the team roster with Minnesota natives. Home games are played at Mariucci Arena. The Golden Gophers' big rivals are the University of Wisconsin–Madison and the University of North Dakota.

Women's hockey

The Golden Gophers women's hockey team has won six NCAA National Championships, most recently in 2016, and nine WCHA Regular Season Championships. They have also won seven WCHA Tournament Championships and have eleven NCAA Frozen Four appearances. They play their home games in Ridder Arena. They were the first collegiate women's hockey team to play in an arena dedicated solely to women's ice hockey. In the 2012–2013 season they finished undefeated at 41–0, and are the first and only NCAA women's hockey team to do so. After winning the NCAA tournament their winning streak stood at 49 games, dating back to February 17, 2012, when they lost to North Dakota.

Women's rugby
The first Division I collegiate women's rugby club in the state, the Golden Gophers women's rugby club team won the Midwest conference championship in 2015, 2016, and 2017.

Women's gymnastics
The Golden Gophers Women's Gymnastics team competes in the Maturi Pavilion. The team has won six Big Ten titles, the most recent in 2016, when they won the regular season championship with a 9–0 record.

Cross Country and Track and Field
The Cross Country and Track and Field programs have produced several professional runners, including Ben Blankenship and Gabriele Grunwald. They also host the Roy Griak meet, a large collegiate cross country meet.

Notable people

See also

 List of colleges and universities in Minnesota

Notes

References

External links

 
 University of Minnesota Athletics
 University Digital Conservancy
 
 
 

 
Educational institutions established in 1851
Flagship universities in the United States
Forestry education
Land-grant universities and colleges
Minneapolis–Saint Paul
Minnesota
University of Minnesota
Universities and colleges in Saint Paul, Minnesota
Minnesota populated places on the Mississippi River
1851 establishments in Minnesota Territory